Grove Academy is an 11–18 mixed secondary school in Broughty Ferry, Dundee, Scotland.

History 
Grove Academy was established in 1889. In 2007, construction began on completely new buildings on the site of the Extension Buildings and huts. The buildings were designed by the Holmes Partnership built under a public-private partnership. It is maintained by the Robertson Facilities Management. An equity stake in the school is retained by private investors. Phase 1 opened 2008 and Phase 2 opened in November 2009. The new school was completed and formally opened on 2 March 2010 by the First Minister of Scotland Alex Salmond.

Academic success 
Of all the schools in Scotland, Grove is one of the highest achieving in terms of academic success. It is placed in the top 30 across the country, an improvement on its placement in the 100s during the 90s.

In 2004, the school was the best performing in Dundee, with 52% of S4 pupils achieving five or more credit level standard grades, 31% of S5s gaining three or more highers and 51% of S6s leaving with three or more highers.

2006 saw the number of S4 pupils achieving five or more standard grade credit level awards in S4 rising from 45% to 58%, the Scottish average being 30%. Grove Academy also reported increases in the number of S6 pupils achieving three or more highers with 48%.

In 2008, Grove Academy led Dundee's exam result attainment, beating the national average in every category. 76% of pupils went on to higher and further education, with 29% of pupils gaining awards at level seven. The results were one of the biggest exam result improvements in Scotland and it has the highest proportion of pupils going on to university, 36%.

Notable alumni 

 Colin Campbell, Lord Malcolm, lawyer and judge
 Alan Cochrane, editor
 W. N. Herbert, poet
 Alastair Johnston, businessman
 James Meek, author
 Lewis Moonie, politician
 G. C. Peden, emeritus professor of history at Stirling University
 James Skea, academic
 David Robertson, former broadcaster and newsreader
 George Thomson, journalist and politician
 Sir Thomas Winsor, lawyer, economic regulatory professional and chief inspector of constabulary
 Gordon Chree, reporter

References

External links 
 
 Pictures of the former school buildings
 New school buildings
 Construction of new buildings
 Design of new school

Broughty Ferry
Secondary schools in Dundee
Educational institutions established in 1889
1889 establishments in Scotland
School buildings completed in 2010